The Empire Award for Best Film is an Empire Award presented annually by the British film magazine Empire to honor the best film of the previous year. The Empire Award for Best Film is one of five ongoing awards which were first introduced at the 1st Empire Awards ceremony in 1996 (the others being Best Actor, Best Actress, Best Director and Best British Film) with Braveheart receiving the award. Star Wars: The Last Jedi is the most recent winner in this category. Winners are voted by the readers of Empire magazine.

Winners and nominees
In the list below, winners are listed first in boldface, followed by the other nominees. The number of the ceremony (1st, 2nd, etc.) appears in parentheses after the awards year, linked to the article (if any) on that ceremony.

"†" indicates the film won the Academy Award for Best Picture.

1990s

2000s

2010s

References

External links

Film
Awards for best film